Dalton is a lunar impact crater that is located near the western limb of the Moon's near side. It is attached to the eastern rim of the walled plain Einstein, with Balboa lying just to the north and Vasco da Gama due south. The rim of this crater is not heavily eroded, and the interior walls are terraced. The interior floor has a system of rilles that are generally concentric with the inner wall. There is a small crater near the southern inner wall, and another at the north face of the small central peak.

References

 
 
 
 
 
 
 
 
 
 
 
 

Impact craters on the Moon